Take It Like a Man is the seventh solo studio album by American singer-songwriter Amanda Shires. It was released on July 29, 2022, through ATO Records. Recording sessions took place at RCA Studio B in Nashville, Tennessee. Production was handled by Lawrence Rothman.

Critical reception 

Take It Like a Man was met with generally favorable reviews from critics. At Metacritic, which assigns a normalized rating out of 100 to reviews from mainstream publications, the album received an average score of 83, based on ten reviews.

Chris Nelson of Mojo gave the album four out of five stars, resuming: "intense. But the much tougher stuff here is emotional". Jenessa Williams of The Guardian praised the album, saying "it's rousing stuff, and with indie-pop producer Lawrence Rothman on hand, her vivid, intentionally raw fiddle-playing is balanced well with expressions of her softer side, seemingly taking inspiration from peers who are blazing trails beyond country's traditional bounds". Writing for Uncut, Lisa Marie Ferla called the album "a bold re-statement of artistic identity". Eric R. Danton of Paste wrote: "for all her strong feelings on Take It Like a Man, Shires remains a poet at heart. If her lyrics here are often forceful, they're also always evocative and sometimes even elegant, whether she's revisiting her fondness for bird imagery or seeking the thrill that accompanies a new relationship". Rolling Stone reviewer found the album "expand[s] her folk-based sound, mixing Radiohead-style atmospherics, Seventies pop melodies and even a splash of soul".

Track listing

Personnel 
 Amanda Shires – vocals, fiddle
 Lawrence Rothman – keyboards, percussion, guitars, producer
 Jason Isbell – guitars
 Fred Eltringham – drums, percussion
 Julian Dorio – drums, percussion
 Jimbo Hart – bass guitar
 Peter Levin – keyboards, organ, piano
 Brittney Spencer – backing vocals
 Maren Morris – backing vocals
 Austin Hoke – cello
 Kristin Weber – violin
 Kris Wilkinson – viola
 Ben Zelico – keyboards, Mellotron
 Peter Stroud – guitars
 Audley Freed – guitars
 Marc Franklin – trumpet
 Art Edmaiston – tenor saxophone
 Kirk Smothers – baritone saxophone
 Kameron Whalum – trombone
 Gena Johnson – engineering
 Louis Remenapp – engineering
 Diana Walsh – assistant engineering
 Pete Lyman – mastering
 Mike Schmelling – photography

Charts

References

External links

2022 albums
ATO Records albums